Mathilde Cannat is a French geologist known for her research on the formation of oceanic crust and the tectonic and magmatic changes of mid-ocean ridges.

Education and career 
Cannat earned her Ph.D. in 1983 from University of Nantes where she worked on ophiolites and tectonic processes. Following her Ph.D., she was a postdoc at Durham University and then she joined the French National Centre for Scientific Research (CNRS) in 1986. In 1992 she obtained a position at the Pierre and Marie Curie University (University of Paris 6) where she remained until she moved to a position at the Institut de Physique du Globe de Paris in 2001.

In 2014, Cannat was elected a fellow of the American Geophysical Union who cited her "for fundamental contributions to understanding the accretion of the oceanic lithosphere and crust".

Research 
Cannat's research centers on magmatism, changes in the oceanic crust, particularly at mid-ocean ridges. Her early research was on ophiolites in California and western Alps, and she used her research on ophiolotes to understand processes on the seafloor. In the mid-1990s, Cannat described the formation of the seafloor at slow-spreading mid-ocean ridges, a model posing that new seafloor is formed from rocks that have been tectonically uplifted from the mantle. This idea differed from the processes described for fast-spreading mid-ocean ridges and, in a 2018 interview, she described this as her greatest achievement. Cannat's research can rely on in situ observations, and she has made seventeen deep-sea dives aboard the Nautile.

Selected publications

Awards and honors 
Silver Medal, French National Centre for Scientific Research (Médaille d’Argent du CNRS) (2009)
Fellow, American Geophysical Union (2014)
Stephan Mueller Medal, European Geosciences Union (2020)

References

External links 
 
2018 interview with Cannat on European Geosciences Union blog

Fellows of the American Geophysical Union
University of Nantes alumni
French National Centre for Scientific Research scientists
Women geologists
Place of birth missing (living people)
1962 births
Living people